Dobromir Tashkov (10 April 1925 – 26 May 2017) was a Bulgarian football player and manager who played as a forward.

Tashkov was born in Varna. He spent his whole career at Spartak Varna and Slavia Sofia. For the Bulgaria national football team Tashkov featured in 7 games and scored 2 goals. He is the number one shooter in Spartak Varna's history with 157 goals.

Honours

Individual
 Bulgarian League Top Scorer: 3 times
 1951/52 (with 10 goals for Spartak Sofia)
 1953/54 (with 25 goals for Slavia Sofia)
 1957/58 (with 9 goals for Slavia Sofia)

References

1925 births
2017 deaths
Bulgarian footballers
Bulgaria international footballers
PFC Slavia Sofia players
PFC Spartak Varna players
First Professional Football League (Bulgaria) players
Bulgarian football managers
Bulgaria national football team managers
AC Omonia managers
Expatriate football managers in Cyprus
Sportspeople from Varna, Bulgaria
Association football forwards
Bulgarian expatriate football managers